was an award-winning Japanese children’s author and illustrator.  He won the  Grand Prize for Kyabetsu-kun (Cabbage Boy) in 1981.

Life
Chō was born Shuji Suzuki in Tokyo in 1928. He began illustrating cartoon strips in the late 1940s. He created the Talkative Fried Egg cartoon for a cartoon monthly in 1959. He also wrote children’s books, including The Gas We Pass: The Story of Farts (Japan 1978, USA 1994).

Awards 

1959 - he won the Bungei Shunju Manga Award for Oshaberi na tamagoyaki (The Talkative Omelet)
1974 - he won an honourable mention in the Hans Christian Andersen Awards for Oshaberi na tamagoyaki (The Talkative Omelet)
1981 - he won the  Grand Prize for Kyabetsu-kun (Cabbage Boy)
1986 - he won an award for Sakasama raion (Upside-Down Lion)
1994 - he received Japan's Medal with Purple Ribbon in recognition of his work as an artist and illustrator
1999 - he won a Japanese Picture Book Award for Gomu-atama Pontarō (Rubber-Headed Pontarō)
2002 - he won the ExxonMobil Children’s Culture Award

Children's books 
The Gas We Pass: The Story of Farts (Onara / おなら)
Umph-a-Lumph, Meow (Tsumi-tsumi nya / つみつみニャー)
Chorus of Winter Buds (Fuyume gasshodan / ふゆめがっしょうだん)
The Easygoing Aquarium (Nonbiri suizokukan / ノンビリすいぞくかん)
The Cats and Their Flying Machine (Gorogoro nyan / ごろごろ　にゃーん)
Up! Up! (Dakko, dakko, nee dakko / だっこだっこねえだっこ)
Rolling Kittens (Korokoro nyan / ころころにゃーん)
A Worm Named Buddy (Mimizu no ossan / みみずのオッサン)
Chomp! (Pakkun pakkun / ぱっくんぱっくん)
Dakuchiru, Dakuchiru
My Beach (Watashi no Umibe)
The Talkative Omelet (Oshaberi na tamagoyaki)	
Spring is Here, Auntie Owl (Fukurō Obasan)
Cabbage Boy (Kyabetsu-kun)
Upside-Down Lion (Sakasama raion)
Rubber-Headed Pontarō (Gomu-atama Pontarō)

References

External links

Shinta Cho on Books from Japan

Japanese children's book illustrators
1927 births
2005 deaths
People from Tokyo